"Grandpa (Tell Me 'Bout the Good Old Days)" is a song written by Jamie O'Hara, and recorded by the American country music duo, The Judds.  It was released in January 1986 as the second single from the album Rockin' with the Rhythm. The song was their sixth No. 1 song on the Billboard magazine Hot Country Singles chart. Members of the Western Writers of America chose it as one of the Top 100 Western songs of all time.

Content
"Grandpa" is a nostalgic country song in which the singer feels overwhelmed by the rapid changes of modern life ("It feels like this world's gone crazy") and wonders if things were really better in her grandfather's time. She asks him:
 if lovers really stayed together for life
 if people really always kept promises
 if families really prayed together
 if fathers really never abandoned their families
Poignantly, the song does not mention how her grandfather responds.

Chart performance

Certifications

Awards
The song won Grammy Awards for both The Judds in Country Duo/ Vocal Group category and for O'Hara in the Country Songwriting Category in 1987.

Cover versions
 Danielle Bradbery covered the song during Season 4 of “The Voice”
 Melinda Schneider and Beccy Cole covered the song on their album Great Women of Country (2014).
Dave Fenley covered this song as a single in 2020.

References

1986 singles
1985 songs
The Judds songs
Songs written by Jamie O'Hara (singer)
RCA Records Nashville singles
Curb Records singles
Song recordings produced by Brent Maher